Plavy is a municipality and village in Jablonec nad Nisou District in the Liberec Region of the Czech Republic. It has about 1,100 inhabitants.

Administrative parts
The village of Haratice is an administrative part of Plavy.

Geography
It lies mostly in the Giant Mountains Foothills, a small part of the municipal territory in the northwest extends into the Jizera Mountains. The Kamenice River flows through the municipality.

History
The first written mention of Plavy is from 1624.

Sport
Plavy is known for a small ski resort. There are three downhill routes.

Notable people
Josef Jindřišek (born 1981), footballer

Twin towns – sister cities

Plavy is twinned with:
 Paszowice, Poland

References

External links

Villages in Jablonec nad Nisou District